is a  Japanese female singer and used to be a gravure idol, actress and a teen idol, had belonged to the show-business production LesPros Entertainment from 1999 to 2008. She is from Komaki, Aichi, and graduated from Hinode High School in March 2007. Then, on 9 October 2008, she retired as an actress. On June 17, 2009, she returned to the entertainment industry through her musical activities.

Filmography

Television

Variety shows 
 THE! Sekai Gyoten News (ザ!世界仰天ニュース), Nippon Television 2006

Dramas 
 Yan-papa (やんパパ), TBS 2002
 Anata no Tonari ni Dareka Iru (あなたの隣に誰かいる), Fuji Television 2003
 Kato-ke e Irasshai! –Nagoya Jo- (加藤家へいらっしゃい! ～名古屋嬢っ～), NBN 2004
 Kinpachi-sensei 7th series, TBS 2004-05
 Diamond no Koi (ダイヤモンドの恋), NHK 2005
 Oishi Propose (おいしいプロポーズ), TBS 2006-
 PS -Rashomon- (PS -羅生門-) as a guest cast in episode 5, TV Asahi 2006
 Hanbun no Tsuki ga Noboru Sora, TV Tokyo 2006-
 Mikkaokure no Happy New Year! (三日遅れのハッピーニューイヤー!), TBS 2007
 Keishicho Sousa-ikka Kyu-gakari (警視庁捜査一課9係), TV Asahi 2008
 Shichinin no Onna-bengoshi (7人の女弁護士), TV Asahi 2008
 Yottsu no Uso (四つの嘘), TV Asahi 2008

Web films 
 Shorai no Wakiyaku (将来の脇役) as Mayumi Miyano, Tokyo DisneySea

Films 
 Kamen Rider Blade Missing Ace, Toei 2004
 Mirrorman Reflex, VAP 2006
 Nekome Kozo (猫目小僧), Art Port 2006
 Kamen Rider The Next,  Toei 2007

Video game 
 Harry Potter and the Chamber of Secrets - Japanese-language version - Ginny Weasley

CM 
 Minute Maid, Coca-Cola 1999-2000
 Filet-O-Fish at Half Price, McDonald's 2000
 Idemitsu Kosan, 2000
 Kuro-goma Pudding (黒ごまプリン), House Foods Corporation 2002
 Gyunyu ni Soudan da. (「牛乳に相談だ。」ラブレター編), Japan Dairy Council 2006-

References

External links
Miku Ishida's wan2 Step♪ - Official Blog since January 2009 
"Girls on the Web" FILE.74: Miku Ishida (October 30, 2001)  - Her interview and photo gallery
Dera Love Miku Ishida 
route39 

Japanese gravure models
1988 births
Living people
People from Komaki, Aichi
Japanese women pop singers
Musicians from Aichi Prefecture
21st-century Japanese singers
21st-century Japanese women singers